Kristinn Thór Kristinsson (born 7 September 1989) is an Icelandic middle-distance runner. He competed in the 800 metres event at the 2014 IAAF World Indoor Championships.

References

1989 births
Living people
Kristinn Thor Kristinsson
Place of birth missing (living people)
Icelandic Athletics Championships winners